Lothar Buchmann (born 15 August 1936) is a German former football player and coach.

Career
As a player, he played for Mainz 05 and Eintracht Bad Kreuznach in the first tiered Oberliga Südwest where he appeared in 191 matches, scoring 49 goals between 1955 and 1963.
After the introduction of the Bundesliga in the season 1963-64 he joined the second division Regionalliga Südwest and Süd clubs Wormatia Worms and VfR Bürstadt. In 131 league matches he marked 26 goals.

In the Bundesliga he managed Darmstadt 98, VfB Stuttgart, Eintracht Frankfurt, Kickers Offenbach and Karlsruher SC between 1978 and 1985. At the helm of Eintracht Frankfurt Buchmann won the DFB-Pokal in 1981.

External links
 Lothar Buchmann at eintracht-archiv.de 
 

1936 births
Living people
Sportspeople from Wrocław
German footballers
1. FSV Mainz 05 players
Wormatia Worms players
VfR Bürstadt players
German football managers
West German expatriate football managers
SV Darmstadt 98 managers
VfB Stuttgart managers
Eintracht Frankfurt managers
Kickers Offenbach managers
Karlsruher SC managers
Viktoria Aschaffenburg managers
Rot-Weiss Essen managers
LASK managers
Bundesliga managers
2. Bundesliga managers
Expatriate football managers in Austria
West German expatriate sportspeople in Austria
Association football forwards
Silesian-German people
West German football managers
West German footballers